Naperville Township is one of nine townships in DuPage County, Illinois, USA.  As of the 2010 census, its population was 100,019 and it contained 39,999 housing units.

Geography

Cities, towns, villages
 Aurora (partial)
 Naperville (mostly)
 Warrenville (partial)

Unincorporated towns
 Batavia Junction at 
 Eola at 
 Frontenac at 
(This list is based on USGS data and may include former settlements.)

Extinct Towns
 Copenhagen at

Cemeteries
The township contains these three cemeteries: Copenhagen, Erb and Naperville.

Major highways
  Interstate 88
  U.S. Route 34
  Illinois Route 59

Airports and landing strips
 Aero Estates Airport
 Edward Hospital Heliport
 Naper Aero Club Airport

Lakes
 Dragon Lake
 Lund Lake
 Quarry Lake
 Spring Lake
 Waubonsie Lake
 Willow Lake

Landmarks
 Dupage County Big Woods Forest Preserve
 Dupage County Springbrook Prairie Forest Preserve
 Illinois Department of Corrections Youth Center (south three-quarters)

Demographics

Township officials
Naperville Township elected its officeholders during the April 2021 consolidated election.

School districts
 Community Unit School District 200
 Indian Prairie Community Unit School District 204
 Naperville Community Unit District 203

Political districts
 Illinois's 13th congressional district
 State House District 48
 State House District 84
 State House District 95
 State House District 96
 State Senate District 24
 State Senate District 42
 State Senate District 48

References
 
 United States Census Bureau 2008 TIGER/Line Shapefiles
 United States National Atlas

External links
 City-Data.com
 Illinois State Archives
 Township Officials of Illinois

Townships in DuPage County, Illinois
1849 establishments in Illinois
Townships in Illinois